Scopula quinquestriata is a moth of the  family Geometridae. It is found in India (Assam).

References

Moths described in 1896
quinquestriata
Moths of Asia